Stronger is the second album from singer-songwriter, Kristine W. The songs are mostly Dance with a few soulful House pop songs in the mix.

"Stronger", "Lovin' You" and "Clubland" were released as singles.

Track listing

References

2000 albums
Kristine W albums